Radim may refer to:

Radim (Jičín District), a municipality and village in the Hradec Králové Region of the Czech Republic
Radim (Kolín District), a municipality and village in the Central Bohemian Region of the Czech Republic
Radim (given name), Slavic origin male given name